In a unanimous vote, on July 1, 2019, the City Council of Charlottesville, Virginia, established a new city holiday, Liberation and Freedom Day, to be celebrated on March 3. Union Army troops, under the command of Major General Philip Sheridan, arrived in Charlottesville on March 3, 1865, liberating over 14,000 enslaved workers. "Blacks were the majority race in the Charlottesville-Albemarle area." In the 1870 Census, the first one in which Charlottesville appears, its population was 2,838.

By 4–1 vote, the City Council decided that the April 13 birthday of Thomas Jefferson, founder of the University of Virginia, will no longer be an official holiday in the city of Charlottesville. News stories report that this change is because Jefferson was a slave owner.

On March 3, 2019, the slaves who built the University were honored in a ceremony held in the University Rotunda. The University has built a Memorial to Enslaved Laborers, honoring the contributions of slaves who helped build and maintain the school. "The memorial was recommended by a commission convened in 2013 to study slavery and the university."

Joining in the March 3 commemoration were:
Albemarle County Office of Equity and Inclusion
Carter G. Woodson Institute for African-American and African Studies at the University of Virginia
Charlottesville City Council
Jefferson School African American Heritage Center
Memorial to Enslaved Laborers Community Engagement Committee
National Association for the Advancement of Colored People at the University of Virginia
Thomas Jefferson Foundation at Monticello
United Ministries of the University of Virginia
Alumni Board of Trustees of the University of Virginia
Virginia Humanities

References

History of Charlottesville, Virginia
Monuments and memorials to Thomas Jefferson
University of Virginia
March observances
Public holidays in the United States
Holidays related to the American Civil War
History of slavery in Virginia
African-American history of Virginia
Enslaved workers at the University of Virginia